Kleppe v. New Mexico, 426 U.S. 529 (1976), was a United States Supreme Court decision that unanimously held the Wild and Free-Roaming Horses and Burros Act of 1971, passed in 1971 by the United States Congress to protect these animals from "capture, branding, harassment, or death", to be a constitutional exercise of congressional power. In February 1974, the  New Mexico Livestock Board rounded up and sold 19 unbranded burros from Bureau of Land Management (BLM) land. When the BLM demanded the animals' return, the state filed suit claiming that the Wild Free-Roaming Horses and Burros Act was unconstitutional, claiming the federal government did not have the power to control animals in federal lands unless they were items in interstate commerce or causing damage to the public lands.

Background
(WFRHBA). The act covered the management, protection and study of "unbranded and unclaimed horses and burros on public lands in the United States." The act requires the Secretary of the Interior and the Secretary of Agriculture to protect and manage wild horses as a component of public property of the United States. Free ranging horses are to be protected from "capture, branding, harassment, or death." The managing agencies are the Bureau of Land Management (BLM) for Interior and the Forest Service (USFS) for Agriculture.

The state of New Mexico challenged the federal government's authority to manage wild horses within the boundaries of New Mexico. A New Mexican rancher, Kelly Stephenson, found wild burros grazing on his land and on the federal land where he had a grazing permit. Stephenson complained to BLM, and when BLM refused to remove the burros, to the New Mexico Livestock Board. The New Mexico Livestock Board, acting under state law then seized nineteen burros from federal land and sold them at public auction. The BLM asserted jurisdiction under the WFRHBA and demanded the return of the animals. New Mexico then filed suit in the federal district court, claiming that the federal law was unconstitutional.

District court
The case was heard by a three judge panel consisting of Oliver Seth, Edwin Mechem, and Harry Payne. The panel declared the WFRHBA unconstitutional, stating that its authority was derived from the "territorial clause," Article IV of the United States Constitution, but that animals do not become federal property simply by being on federal land. Citing cases where the federal government regulated deer populations based on damage to federal lands, but arguing that the WFRHBA presented no evidence that horses or burros were inflicting damage, the court enjoined the federal government from enforcing the Act, holding that the statute unconstitutionally exceeded the federal government's authority by protecting free-roaming horses and burros, rather than the land upon which they lived.

Supreme Court

Justice Thurgood Marshall delivered the opinion of a unanimous court. The Court interpreted the property clause broadly and found the WFRHBA a constitutional exercise of Congressional authority, holding, "the Property Clause also gives Congress the power to protect wildlife on the public lands, state law notwithstanding." wrote that the complete power' that Congress has over public lands necessarily includes the power to regulate and protect the wildlife living there." In addition, the Court said that Congress may enact legislation governing federal lands pursuant to the property clause and "when Congress so acts, federal legislation necessarily overrides conflicting state laws under the supremacy clause."

See also
List of United States Supreme Court cases, volume 426

Notes

References

Further reading

 Fischman, Robert L., and Jeremiah I. Williamson. "The Story of Kleppe v. New Mexico: The Sagebrush Rebellion as Un-Cooperative Federalism." University of Colorado Law Review 83 (2011): 123+ online

External links
 

United States Supreme Court cases
United States Supreme Court cases of the Burger Court
United States land use case law
1976 in the environment
1976 in United States case law
Feral horses
Legal history of New Mexico
United States Department of the Interior